Luis Felipe Rodríguez Bolívar is a Venezuelan paralympic athlete. He competed at the 2020 Summer Paralympics in the athletics competition, winning the silver medal in the Men's 400 metres T20 class, finishing in a time of 47.71.

References 

Living people
Place of birth missing (living people)
Year of birth missing (living people)
Athletes (track and field) at the 2020 Summer Paralympics
Medalists at the 2020 Summer Paralympics
Venezuelan male sprinters
Paralympic medalists in athletics (track and field)
Paralympic athletes of Venezuela
Paralympic silver medalists for Venezuela
21st-century Venezuelan people